Chagan may refer to:

Places
 Chagan (closed city), an abandoned closed city in Kazakhstan, currently a ghost town
 Chagan, Da'an, Jilin (叉干镇), a town in Da'an, Jilin, China
 Chagan (差干镇), a town in Pingyuan County, Guangdong, China
 Birinci Çağan, a village in Shamakhi Rayon, Azerbaijan
 Chekan, also known as Chagān, a village in East Azerbaijan Province, Iran
 İkinci Çağan, a village in Shamakhi Rayon, Azerbaijan

Other
 Chagan (nuclear test)
 Chagan (Ural), a river in the West Kazakhstan Region, Kazakhstan, and Orenburg Oblast, Russia
 Chagan River (tributary of Irtysh River), a river in the Abai Region, Kazakhstan
 Khagan, a title of imperial rank in the Mongolian and Turkic languages
 Dolon (air base), in Kazakhstan, also called Chagan
 Lake Chagan, a lake formed in the crater of the 1965 Soviet Chagan nuclear test

See also
Shagan (disambiguation)